Kampong Tanjong Maya is a village in Tutong District, Brunei, about  from the district town Pekan Tutong. The population was 488 in 2016. It is one of the villages within Mukim Tanjong Maya, a mukim in the district.

Facilities 
Abdul Rashid Primary School is the village primary school; it was opened on 20 March 1930 and named after the then penghulu of the village.

Tanjong Maya Religious School is the village school for the primary level of the country's Islamic religious education.

Kampong Tanjong Maya Mosque is the village mosque; it was inaugurated on 6 July 1973 by Sultan Hassanal Bolkiah. The mosque can accommodate 400 worshippers.

References 

Tanjong Maya